Guinea is divided into 8 regions among which the national capital Conakry ranks as a special zone (and is further divided into 5 communes). The other 7 regions are further subdivided into 33 prefectures and thence into sub-prefectures; which are later subdivided into local units (i.e.: districts and quarters) and further subdivided into smaller units (i.e.: villages and sectors).

Prefectures 

The special zone of Conakry and the 33 prefectures are shown below according to their region, with their populations at recent censuses:

See also
Administrative divisions of Guinea
Sub-prefectures of Guinea
ISO 3166-2:GN

References 

 
Subdivisions of Guinea
Guinea, Prefectures
Guinea 2
Prefectures, Guinea
Guinea geography-related lists